Bashful may refer to:

Bashful (film), a 1917 American film
Bashful (character), a character from Snow White and the Seven Dwarfs
Bashful elephant, a stalagmite in Carlsbad Caverns, New Mexico, US
Bashful Peak, a mountain in Alaska, US
Boleslaus the Bashful (1226–1279), a Polish prince 
Bashful (Pac-Man), one of the ghosts in the arcade game Pac-Man (original name Kimagure (気まぐれ))